Captain Arthur J. M. Hastings, OBE, is a fictional character created by Agatha Christie as the companion-chronicler and best friend of the Belgian detective, Hercule Poirot. He is first introduced in Christie's 1920 novel The Mysterious Affair at Styles (originally written in 1916) and appears as a character in seven other Poirot novels, including the final one Curtain: Poirot's Last Case (1975), along with a play and many short stories. He is also the narrator of several of them.

Literary function
Hastings is today strongly associated with Poirot, due more to the television adaptations than to the novels. Many of the early TV episodes of Agatha Christie's Poirot were adaptations of short stories, in most of which he appeared in print. A few were stories into which he had been adapted (for example, Murder in the Mews). In Christie's original writings, however, Hastings is not in every short story or novel. He is not a character in either Death on the Nile or Murder on the Orient Express, the two best-known Poirot novels. Of the twenty-two Poirot novels published between 1920 and 1937, he appears in seven. Moreover, when Christie expanded The Submarine Plans (1923) as The Incredible Theft (1937), she removed Hastings.

Hastings appears to have been introduced by Christie in accordance with the model of Sherlock Holmes's associate, Doctor Watson, to whom he bears a marked resemblance. Both narrate in the first person, both are slow to see the significance of clues, and both stand as a form of surrogate for the reader. There are even similarities of role: Hastings is Poirot's only close friend and the two share a flat briefly when Poirot sets up his detective agency. Similarly to Watson, Hastings also has a penchant for speculation and gambling, as well as a military background in the colonial Middle East. The presence of Chief Inspector Japp, a close "literary descendant" of Holmes's Inspector Lestrade, fleshed out Christie's adoption of the Holmes paradigm.

In the novels, Hastings's literary function changes with Poirot's method. In the earlier phase of his career, Hastings is valued for his imaginative approach to cases, inevitably giving rise to fanciful hypotheses that Poirot gently mocks. Poirot himself characterised Hastings thus in "The Mystery of the Spanish Chest" (1932): How my dear friend, Hastings, would have enjoyed this! What romantic flights of imagination he would have had. What ineptitudes he would have uttered! Ah ce cher Hastings, at this moment, today, I miss him... Later in her career, Christie's apparatus is less fanciful and the opportunity for wild speculation much diminished. When the need for a sidekick arises in the later novels and stories it is either as:
 a suspect;
 Miss Lemon, who, in direct contrast with Hastings, is completely unimaginative;
 Mr Satterthwaite: a great observer of human nature who avoids passing judgments;
 Ariadne Oliver: a crime novelist who opened to Christie the opportunity for self-satire.

Although Hastings remains the most popular of Poirot's sidekicks, his appearance in only eight of the thirty-three Poirot novels indicates that the character's service to Christie's literary purpose was somewhat limited.

Career
Similarly to his friend Poirot, details of Hastings's life before 1916 are not revealed, though the reader is able to pinpoint Hastings's approximate birth year as 1886 from the first chapter of The Mysterious Affair at Styles, as he mentions that John Cavendish was 'a good fifteen years [his] senior' though hardly looking 'his forty-five years'. This makes Hastings thirty years old at the start of the novel. It is also mentioned later on that he was employed at Lloyd's prior to the war. Neither his first name nor his rank is mentioned in this novel. Elsewhere he states that he attended Eton College.

Hastings meets Poirot in Belgium several years before their meeting on 16 July 1916, at Styles Court, Essex, which is their first encounter in literature. The two remain friends right up to Poirot's death. Although there is little evidence regarding their possible subsequent meetings, Hastings saw Poirot a year before the latter's death.

Hastings, while being no great detective himself, serves Poirot in many ways. A former British Army officer in World War I, he is brave. He has courage and is often used by Poirot for physical duties such as catching and subduing a criminal. Poirot likes to tease Hastings about being dim-witted at times, but he clearly enjoys the Captain's company. In The Mysterious Affair at Styles and The A.B.C. Murders, Hastings plays a prominent role in the resolution of the mystery, with a casual observation that leads Poirot to the guilty party: In case of the former, by mentioning that Poirot had to straighten some spill holders and ornaments in Styles, he prompts Poirot to realise that someone had moved them, causing Poirot to discover a crucial piece of evidence. In the case of the latter, he suggests that the error in recipient address of a letter by the murderer was deliberate, thus causing Poirot to realise the murderer had attached greater importance to that particular murder.

Hastings represents the traditional English gentleman—not too bright but absolutely scrupulous, a throwback to the Victorian-era gentleman who is always concerned about "fair play". Hastings himself notes that he is somewhat old-fashioned. While Poirot, who is not above lying, surreptitiously reads other people's letters or eavesdrops, Hastings is horrified of such acts and usually refuses to perform them to help Poirot in one of his cases. Although he lacks Poirot's intellect, Poirot often compliments Hastings' ability to remember facts and details about their cases even if he deplores the manner in which Hastings tells the story at times. Hastings' physical appearance is rarely described in the novels because he is often the narrator. However, it is mentioned that he, like Poirot, has a moustache which becomes a target of the detective's criticism in Peril at End House: 'And your moustache. If you must have a moustache, let it be a real moustache, a thing of beauty such as mine.' Although he has served in the army, Hastings is not a ruthless man by nature, with Poirot noting during his final letter to Hastings in Curtain that he knows that Hastings is not a murderer.

Relationship with women
Hastings has a soft spot for auburn-haired women. Back in The Mysterious Affair at Styles, Hastings was charmed with auburn-haired Cynthia Murdoch and proposed to her. This would become a running gag in the series, with Poirot often teasing Hastings. Whenever Hastings suggests the innocence of a young, beautiful, female murder suspect, Poirot slyly asks "Does she have auburn hair?"  This pronounced weakness for pretty women with auburn hair gets Hastings and Poirot into trouble more than once: in The Big Four, while posing as secretary for millionaire Abe Ryland, Hastings trusts false information from a woman with auburn hair, while in the short story Double Sin, Hastings believes auburn-haired Mary Durant.

Despite his preference for auburn hair and his Victorian ideas about not marrying outside one's class, he eventually falls in love with a dark-haired music-hall actress, singer and acrobat, Dulcie Duveen, the self-styled 'Cinderella'. They meet in the story Murder on the Links, the second full-length Poirot novel. Poirot plays a rather significant part in uniting the couple. Hastings then acquires a ranch in Argentina and settles down to a life as a ranchholder.

Later appearances

Hastings's appearances in Poirot's later novels are restricted to a few cases in which he participates on his periodic returns to England from Argentina. Poirot comments in The ABC Murders that he enjoys Hastings's visits because he always has his most interesting cases when Hastings is with him. In the course of The Big Four, Dulcie's life is threatened by members of an international conspiracy. Hastings is forced to risk Poirot's life in return for her promised safety. In other respects there is very little personal detail regarding Hastings in these novels, until Curtain: Poirot's Last Case, which takes place after World War II: with his wife now dead, Hastings rejoins Poirot at Styles to help tackle one last case. The novel culminates with Poirot dying of a heart attack, leaving Hastings a confession explaining his role in events as he tracked a criminal who manipulated others to commit murder for him. Poirot's friendship with Hastings is further referenced when the murderer's attempt to manipulate Hastings in such a manner leaves Poirot resolved to kill his adversary, despite his disapproval of murder, as he knew that his friend would normally never do such a thing.

Final appearance

Curtain provides additional details on Hastings's family: He and Dulcie have two sons and two daughters. One son joins the Royal Navy, while the other and his wife manage the ranch after Dulcie's death. Hastings's daughter Grace is married to a British officer stationed in India. His other daughter, Judith, appears as a character in Curtain. Judith is Hastings's youngest child and his favourite, albeit the child whom he understands the least. She marries Dr John Franklin, a medical researcher, and moves to Africa with him. In the postscript of Curtain, Poirot suggests that Hastings should consider a second marriage with Elizabeth Litchfield, the younger sister of a woman who was manipulated into killing her abusive father by the novel's antagonist. Poirot notes that Elizabeth must be reassured that she is not tainted by her sister's actions and that Hastings is still not unattractive to women. Age is not specifically discussed for Hastings after the first book; he is said to be 30 in The Mysterious Affair at Styles, which would leave him at least 60 years old in the earliest setting for Curtain. That novel was published in 1975, though written during the Second World War. No specific time is made clear in Curtain, unlike most of the Poirot stories, however when Poirot says “the food, it is disgusting”, Hastings says “rationing, I suppose”. Food rationing was in place in Britain until midnight on 4 July 1954, nine years after the end of the Second World War. In addition, it is clear that the story is set when capital punishment by hanging was still occurring in the UK; the last woman hanged in the UK was in 1955. These two facts place the events of Curtain in time no later than 1954, and Hastings is therefore, as he says himself, “I’m pushing it a bit”; with four adult children and having done service in the First World War, he must be in his 60s.

Portrayals
Hastings has been portrayed on film and television by several actors, Richard Cooper in Black Coffee (1931) and Lord Edgware Dies (1934); Robert Morley in The Alphabet Murders (1965); Jonathan Cecil in three TV films – Thirteen at Dinner (1985), Dead Man's Folly (1986) and Murder in Three Acts (1986); Dmitry Krylov in the Soviet film Mystery Endhauz (1989, directed by Vadim Derbenyov); and  Hugh Fraser, who portrayed Hastings alongside David Suchet's Poirot in 43 of the 70 episodes of Agatha Christie's Poirot. He is also a main character in the anime Agatha Christie's Great Detectives Poirot and Marple.

In the BBC Radio 4 dramatisations starring John Moffatt as Hercule Poirot, Captain Hastings was played by Jeremy Clyde in Murder on the Links (1990), and by Simon Williams in Lord Edgware Dies (1992), The ABC Murders (2000), Peril at End House (2000), The Mysterious Affair at Styles (2005), and Dumb Witness (2006).

The Hastings novels
Hastings narrates the majority of the short stories featuring Poirot, but appears in only eight of the novels, seven of which were written before 1940:

 The Mysterious Affair at Styles (1916 but published in 1920)
 The Murder on the Links (1923)
 The Big Four (1927)
 Peril at End House (1932)
 Lord Edgware Dies (1933) – published in the U.S. as Thirteen at Dinner
 The A.B.C. Murders (1936)
 Dumb Witness (1937)
 Curtain: Poirot's Last Case (1975)

Hastings is the narrator of all stories in Poirot Investigates (1924), a collection of short stories. Hastings is also present in Christie's play Black Coffee (1930) and its novelisation alongside Poirot.

References

External links
Hastings at the official Agatha Christie website
Hastings and Poirot at the new home of Agatha Christie website
Biography of Captain Hastings

Characters in British novels of the 20th century
Fictional British Army officers
Literary characters introduced in 1920
Fictional farmers
Fictional military captains
Fictional people educated at Eton College
Fictional World War I veterans
Agatha Christie characters
Hercule Poirot characters
Sidekicks in literature
Fictional English people
Male characters in literature